is a Japanese modern pentathlete. Kurosu is from Shimotsuma, Ibaraki. Her training facilities were devastated in the 2011 Tōhoku earthquake risking her qualification for the 2012 Summer Olympics. However, she was offered suitable training facilities by a South Korean coach and she relocated to the country for training. Kurosu qualified for the Olympic Games at the Asian Championships.

At the 2012 Summer Olympics, she competed in the women's competition, finishing in 34th place. In the riding discipline, she drew Zafira, an unfavorable horse, which caused her to tire in time the combined running and shooting discipline was underway. In the discipline – the last discipline of the last event of the Olympic Games – she was the last sportsperson to finish an event, which earned her cheers of encouragement from the crowd.

At the 2013 Asian Championships, she was part of the Japanese team that won silver.

References

External links
  
 

Japanese female modern pentathletes
Living people
1991 births
Olympic modern pentathletes of Japan
Modern pentathletes at the 2012 Summer Olympics
Asian Games medalists in modern pentathlon
Modern pentathletes at the 2010 Asian Games
Modern pentathletes at the 2014 Asian Games
Medalists at the 2014 Asian Games
Asian Games silver medalists for Japan
20th-century Japanese women
21st-century Japanese women